Hari Mohan Bangur (born 1952/53) is an Indian businessman, who is currently the Managing Director of Shree Cement.

Early life
He is the son of Benu Gopal Bangur, and great grandson of Mugnee Ram Bangur.

He studied chemical engineering at IIT, Bombay.

Career
Bangur has been a director of Shree Cement since 1992, and is its CEO.

In 2002 Shree Cement was in deep trouble, and he nearly agreed a 50/50 merger with the French cement company Vicat. With his father's approval, he declined the merger and turned things around, increasing capacity ten-fold over a decade, and with the share price rising from Rs 45 ten years ago to Rs 4,500.

As of 2016, the Bangur family owns 65% of Shree Cement.

Personal life
He has a son, Prashant, who is the joint managing director.

References 

1950s births
Living people
Businesspeople from Kolkata
IIT Bombay alumni